Klára Davidson Spilková (born 15 December 1994) is a Czech professional golfer who plays on the Ladies European Tour (LET). She won the 2017 Lalla Meryem Cup and the 2022 Women's Irish Open.

Early life and amateur career
Spilková had a successful amateur career after she was introcued to golf by her older brother Lukas at the age of four. She won the European Young Masters in 2009, and won both the Czech Women's Amateur and the German Girls Open back to back in 2009 and 2010. In 2010 she won the Austrian Women's Amateur. 

She lost the final of the 2009 French International Lady Juniors Amateur Championship (Trophée Esmond) 1 up to Leona Maguire. Her performance helped her qualify for the continental team, and she represented Europe at the 2009 Junior Solheim Cup and the 2010 Junior Ryder Cup. 

In 2010, at only fifteen, she made her first LET start at the Allianz Ladies Slovak Open, but missed the cut by two strokes.

Professional career
Spilková turned professional in 2011 at age 16 and joined the Ladies European Tour. She was 7th in the Rolex Rookie of the Year standings, behind winner Caroline Hedwall. She finished tied sixth in the 2013 ISPS Handa Ladies European Masters and at the 2014 Turkish Ladies Open. In 2015, she tied for 4th at the Ladies Scottish Open.

In 2017, Spilková became the first Czech winner on the LET with her victory at the Lalla Meryem Cup.

Spilková finished fourth at the inaugural LPGA Tour Q-Series to earn a card for 2019. Over the next three seasons she finished 140, 100 and 127th in the rankings, with a best finish of tied 8th at the 2020 Gainbridge LPGA at Boca Rio.

As the highest ranked Czech golfer, she represented her country at the 2016 Summer Olympics in Rio de Janeiro and the 2020 Summer Olympics in Tokyo, and finished tied 48th and 23rd.

In 2022, Spilková rejoined the LET. She was runner-up at the Tipsport Czech Ladies Open, a stroke behind compatritot Jana Melichová. She then secured her second LET victory with a birdie at the first playoff hole at the KPMG Women's Irish Open, seeing off Finland’s Ursula Wikström and Denmark’s Nicole Broch Estrup.

Personal life
In 2022, Spilková married Sean Davidson, an Italian American teacher at the Faculty of Law of Charles University in Prague. A college golfer at Davidson College they met on the golf course, and he has caddied for her occasionally, including at the Olympics in Tokyo, as well as for his brother Matt, a former PGA Tour player.

Amateur wins
2009 German Girls Open, Czech Women's Amateur, European Young Masters
2010 German Girls Open, Czech Women's Amateur, Austrian Women's Amateur

Professional wins (2)

Ladies European Tour wins (2)

Team appearances
Amateur
Espirito Santo Trophy (representing Czech Republic): 2008, 2010
Junior Solheim Cup (representing Europe): 2009
Junior Ryder Cup (representing Europe): 2010

References

External links

Czech female golfers
Ladies European Tour golfers
LPGA Tour golfers
Olympic golfers of the Czech Republic
Golfers at the 2016 Summer Olympics
Golfers at the 2020 Summer Olympics
Sportspeople from Prague
1994 births
Living people